Prof. Tula Giannini is an American academic with subject expertise in musicology, digital culture, and digital heritage.

Tula Giannini holds B.M. and M.M. degrees in Performance from the Manhattan School of Music, an M.L.S. degree in Library Science from Rutgers University, and a Ph.D. degree in Musicology from Bryn Mawr College. Early in her career, she was a professional flautist. She taught at the Catholic University, Rutgers University, and the University of Hawaiʻi. Director of the Talbott Library at Westminster Choir College, and Head of Collection Management at Adelphi University. She joined the Pratt Institute in 1998 and served as Dean of the School of Information and Library Science (SILS), from 2015 renamed to the School of Information under her leadership, From 2004 to 2017, Giannini served as Dean of the School of Information at Pratt Institute where she is a tenured full professor.

Giannini has overseen the introduction of new academic/professional programs at the Pratt Institute, including: Advanced Certificates in Archives (2004), Museum Libraries (2005), Conservation and Digital Curation (2016); a Dual Masters with the Department of Digital Arts at Pratt (2008), which received an Innovation Award from NASED; an M.S. degree in Museums and Digital Culture (2015); M.S. in Information Experience Design and M.S. in Data Analytics and Visualization (2016). She received four significant Institute of Museum and Library Services (IMLS) grants for programs involving digital cultural heritage: GATEWAI (Graduate Archives Training and Education, Work and Information); M-LEAD I and M-LEAD II (Museum Library Education and Digitization); and CHART (Cultural Heritage: Access, Research and Technology), which resulted in the Brooklyn Visual Heritage website.

Giannini has contributed entries to The Grove Dictionary of Musical Instruments, published by Oxford University Press. She has also published books.

Selected publications

References

External links
 Tula Giannini homepage
 Tula Giannini on ResearchGate
 Tula Giannini on DBLP
 

Year of birth missing (living people)
Living people
People from Manhattan
Manhattan School of Music alumni
Rutgers University alumni
Bryn Mawr College alumni
20th-century American women musicians
21st-century American women scientists
American women academics
American women musicologists
American musicologists
American women curators
American curators
American classical flautists
Information scientists
American women librarians
American librarians
Pratt Institute faculty
20th-century flautists